The second season of The Voice, the Australian reality talent show, premiered on 7 April 2013. Season 1 coach, Keith Urban left the show and was therefore replaced by Ricky Martin. This is the last season to feature Delta Goodrem and Seal until they both return in Seasons 4 and 6, respectively.

Format

The season is part of the television franchise, The Voice and is based on a similar competition format in The Netherlands entitled The Voice of Holland. The winner receives a recording contract with Universal Music. This season consists of four phases: the blind auditions, battle phase, followed by the showdowns and finally the live performance shows.

For the second season, during the battle rounds phase of the competition, opposing coaches have the ability to steal the singer that was sent home by the original coach. If more than one coach hits their buzzer to recruit the singer in question, the contestant decides which coach to work with. This format was first used in the third season of the American version of The Voice.

Coaches and hosts
Season 1 coaches Delta Goodrem, Joel Madden and Seal returned. It was announced in September 2012 that Keith Urban would not be returning as a coach for the second season, after accepting an offer to join the American Idol judging panel. Following an extensive search process by producers, and constant media speculation on who would replace Urban, Ricky Martin was officially announced as the new coach in November 2012. In response to joining the series, Martin paid tribute to Urban saying he was "humbled to be sitting in his chair". Nine's Director of Television, Michael Healy stated that Martin would bring "huge experience" and be the "perfect addition" to the coaching panel, with Goodrem, Madden and Seal all publicly expressing excitement at the news via their Twitter accounts.

Mentors for the second season were announced on 1 March 2013 as Ryan Tedder, Jessica Mauboy, Ben Lee and Connie Mitchell, who teamed up with Goodrem, Martin, Madden and Seal respectively.

Darren McMullen returned as host for the second season, while Faustina Agolley also returned as social media correspondent.

Teams
Color key

Blind auditions

Episode 1 (7 April)
The first episode of the Blind Auditions was broadcast on 7 April 2013. The coaches performed a cover of "Diamonds" together at the start of the show.

Celia Pavey and Kaity Dunstan both entered the ARIA Singles Charts after their performances at No. 27 and No. 40 respectively.

Episode 2 (8 April)
The second episode of the Blind Auditions was broadcast on 8 April 2013.

Harrison Craig entered the ARIA Singles Charts after his performance at No. 18.

Episode 3 (9 April)
The third episode of the Blind Auditions was broadcast on 9 April 2013.

Episode 4 (10 April)
The fourth episode of the Blind Auditions was broadcast on 10 April 2013.

There was an error with the chairs during Kathy Hinch's audition because they wouldn't turn when they pressed it. The error was later fixed at the end of her audition still making her through to the show

Episode 5 (14 April)
The fifth episode of the Blind Auditions was broadcast on 14 April 2013.

Episode 6 (15 April)
The sixth episode of the Blind Auditions was broadcast on 15 April 2013.

+Delta pressed Ricky's button

Imogen Brough entered the ARIA Singles Charts following her performance, at No. 43.

Episode 7 (16 April)
The seventh episode of the Blind Auditions was broadcast on 16 April 2013.

Episode 8 (21 April)
The eighth episode of the Blind Auditions was broadcast on 21 April 2013.

Episode 9 (22 April)
The ninth and final episode of the Blind Auditions was broadcast on 22 April 2013.

Battle rounds

Episode 1 (23 April)
The first episode of the Battle Rounds was broadcast on 23 April 2013.

 – Contestant wins battle round/advances to showdown
 – Contestant loses battle round but gets saved/advances 
 – Contestant loses battle round and is eliminated

Celia Pavey and Harrison Craig both entered the ARIA Singles Charts after their performances at No. 33 and No. 40 respectively.  Celia rose to No. 23 the week later.

Episode 2 (28 April)
The second episode of the Battle Rounds was broadcast on 28 April 2013.

 – Contestant wins battle round/advances to showdown
 – Contestant loses battle round but gets saved/advances 
 – Contestant loses battle round and is eliminated

Episode 3 (29 April)
The third episode of the Battle Rounds was broadcast on 29 April 2013.

 – Contestant wins battle round/advances to showdown
 – Contestant loses battle round but gets saved/advances 
 – Contestant loses battle round and is eliminated

Episode 4 (30 April)
The fourth and final episode of the Battle Rounds was broadcast on 30 April 2013.

 – Contestant wins battle round/advances to showdown
 – Contestant loses battle round but gets saved/advances 
 – Contestant loses battle round and is eliminated

Mitchell Anderson and Steve Clisby both entered the ARIA Singles Charts after their performances at No. 62 and No. 72 respectively. Steve rose to No. 60 the week later

Showdown rounds

Week 1 (5–7 May)
5 May
The first episode of the Showdowns was broadcast on 5 May 2013.
 – Contestant saved by the voters at home
 – Contestant was in the bottom 3 and was sent to the sing-off
 – Contestant received the fewest votes and was instantly eliminated

Harrison Craig, Miss Murphy, Alex Gibson and Michelle Martinez entered the ARIA Singles Charts after their performances at No. 13, No. 30, No. 49 and No. 87 respectively.

6 May
The second episode of the Showdowns was broadcast on 6 May 2013.
 – Contestant saved by the voters at home
 – Contestant was in the bottom 3 and was sent to the sing-off
 – Contestant received the fewest votes and was instantly eliminated

Jackie Sannia, Steve Clisby, Michael Paynter and Kiyomi Vella entered the ARIA Singles Charts after their performances at No. 24, No. 31, No. 34 and No. 48 respectively.

7 May
The first episode of the Live shows was broadcast on 7 May 2013.

Sing-off performances
 Contestant was saved by the coach
 Contestant was eliminated

Guest Performance: will.i.am – #thatpower

Week 2 (12–14 May)
12 May
The third episode of the Showdowns was broadcast on 12 May 2013.
 – Contestant saved by the voters at home
 – Contestant was in the bottom 3 and was sent to the sing-off
 – Contestant received the fewest votes and was instantly eliminated

Luke Kennedy, Emma Pask, Caterina Torres, Mitchell Anderson and Jac Stone entered the ARIA Singles Charts after their performances at No. 8, No. 15, No. 28, No. 88 and No. 92 respectively.

13 May
The fourth episode of the Showdowns was broadcast on 13 May 2013.
 – Contestant saved by the voters at home
 – Contestant was in the bottom 3 and was sent to the sing-off
 – Contestant received the fewest votes and was instantly eliminated

Celia Pavey, Michael Stangel, Lyric McFarland and Danny Ross entered the ARIA Singles Charts after their performances at No. 29, No. 41, No. 51, and No. 93 respectively.

14 May
The second episode of the Live shows was broadcast on 14 May 2013.

Sing-off performances
 Contestant was saved by the coach
 Contestant was eliminated

Guest Performance: The Wanted – Walks Like Rihanna

Live Finals

Episode 20 (20 May)
The first episode of the Live shows was broadcast on 20 May 2013.

 – Contestant saved by the voters at home
 – Contestant was sent through by the coach before votings
 – Contestant received the fewest votes and was instantly eliminated

Harrison Craig (No. 6), Luke Kennedy (No. 11), Celia Pavey (No. 15), Kiyomi Vella (No. 45), Miss Murphy (No. 49), Jackie Sannia (No. 65), Jac Stone (No. 76), Mitchell Anderson (No. 79), Michael Paynter (No. 80), Michael Stangel (No. 82), Simon Meli (No. 86) and Steve Clisby (No. 89) entered the ARIA Singles Charts after their performances.

Episode 21 (27 May)
The second episode of the Live shows was broadcast on 27 May 2013.

 – Contestant saved by the voters at home
 – Contestant was chosen by the coach
 – Contestant was not chosen by the coach

Guest Performance: Gurrumul Yunupingu and Delta Goodrem – Bayini

Harrison Craig (No. 12), Celia Pavey (No. 23), Luke Kennedy (No. 25), Miss Murphy (No. 30), Danny Ross (No. 33), Jackie Sannia (No. 42), Steve Clisby (No. 49), Mitchell Anderson (No. 54), Kiyomi Vella (No. 58), Michael Stangel (No. 65) entered the ARIA Singles Charts after their performances.

Episode 22 (3 June)
The third episode of the Live shows was broadcast on 3 June 2013.

 – Contestant saved by the voters at home
 – Contestant received the fewest votes and was eliminated

Guest Performance: Karise Eden – Threads of Silence

Celia Pavey (No. 23), Harrison Craig (No. 24), Miss Murphy (No. 32), Luke Kennedy (No. 35), Steve Clisby (No. 49), Kiyomi Vella (No. 59), Danny Ross (No. 69), Mitchell Anderson (No. 83) entered the ARIA Singles Charts after their performances.

Semi-finals

Episode 23 (10 June)
The fourth episode of the Live shows was broadcast on 10 June 2013.

 – Contestant saved by the voters at home
 – Contestant received the fewest votes and was eliminated
 – Winner
 – Runner-up
 – Third place
 – Fourth place

Harrison Craig's Unchained Melody (No. 2) and More Than a Dream (No. 3), Luke Kennedy's Love Is Gone (No. 22) and Caruso (No. 23), Celia Pavey's Candle in the Night (No. 32) and Xanadu (No. 73) and Danny Ross's Let Her Go (No. 78) and Windmill (No. 89) entered the ARIA Singles Charts after their performances.

Coach and Group performances

Guest Performance: Timomatic – Parachute

Grand final

Episode 24 (17 June)
The Grand Final was broadcast on 17 June 2013.

Results summary

Team Seal
Colour key

Team Joel
Colour key

Team Delta
Colour key

Team Ricky
Colour key

Elimination Chart

Overall
Artist's info

Result details

Artist's info

Result details

Guest performance(s)

Reception

Ratings
 Colour key:
  – Highest rating during the season
  – Lowest rating during the season

Notes

One contestant who successfully secured a spot on team Joel, Adam Lerossignol, left the competition shortly after being selected due to personal reasons. His performance of behind blue eyes was not televised.

References

External links 
 

2013 Australian television seasons
2